Scopula clandestina  is a moth of the family Geometridae. It is endemic to Madagascar.

References

Moths described in 1956
clandestina
Moths of Madagascar
Taxa named by Claude Herbulot